Kamal Butros Nasser (1925 – 9 or 10 April 1973) was a Palestinian political leader, writer and poet.

Early life
Nasser was born in Gaza in 1924 to a Palestinian Christian family. He was educated at Bir Zeit school (now Bir Zeit University). Then he studied political science at the American University of Beirut and graduated in 1945. Later he worked as a teacher while studying law in Jerusalem. In the period following the 1948 Palestine War, Nasser worked as a journalist.

Political life
He was responsible for producing the al-Ba‘ath newspaper from Ramallah and also set up al-Jil al-Jadid (The New Era), a militant newspaper. In 1956 he was elected to Jordanian parliament as Ba‘ath member for Ramallah district. He did not serve out his term as a result of his expulsion from Parliament during the subsequent martial law period in Jordan. Expelled from West Bank by Israel in 1967, Nasser became editor of the PLO newspaper, Filastin al-Thawra. In addition, at that time he became a member of PLO Executive Committee from February 1969 to July 1971 serving as an official with the office of National Guidance. In 1970, he was also spokesman for the committee. In addition, he served as spokesman for the PLO.

Death
Nasser was killed in West Beirut on the night of 9 April 1973 by Israeli special forces during an Israeli raid on Lebanon along with Kamal Adwan and Mohammed Yousef Najjar. All three men were included in Operation Wrath of God target list for their alleged participation in the Munich massacre.

Legacy
The main auditorium of Birzeit University is named after him.

Works
Kamal Nasser was a published poet and a number of his poems have been translated into English, including The Story and The Last Poem.

References

20th-century male writers
20th-century Palestinian poets
1925 births
1973 deaths
American University of Beirut alumni
Assassinated Palestinian politicians
Operation Wrath of God
People killed in Mossad operations
Palestinian Arab nationalists
Palestinian Christians
Palestinian male poets
Palestinian writers
People from Gaza City